Tomi Kristian Kallio (born 27 January 1977) is a Finnish former professional ice hockey right winger who last played for HC TPS in the Finnish Liiga. After retiring from TPS in 2018, Kallio remained with the team and assumed the role of director of European scouting.

Playing career
Kallio was drafted 81st overall by the Colorado Avalanche in the 1995 NHL Entry Draft and began his professional career with TPS of the SM-liiga and spent five seasons there, winning the championship trophy in 1999 and 2000.

He then moved to the National Hockey League with the Atlanta Thrashers who claimed him from Colorado in the 1999 NHL Expansion Draft. He spent two seasons in Atlanta before he was traded with Pauli Levokari to the Columbus Blue Jackets for Petteri Nummelin and Chris Nielsen. He would play just 12 games for Columbus before claimed off waivers by the Philadelphia Flyers, playing just seven games before moving to Sweden to play for Västra Frölunda HC where he continued to play for the rest of the season. He won the Le Mat Trophy twice with Frölunda, in 2003 and 2005.

On 19 January 2009, Kallio extended his contract with Frölunda HC by two years. After being denied another extension after his contract expired in 2011, Kallio signed a two-year contract with Växjö Lakers Hockey in the Elitserien. In the 2011 European Trophy, Kallio visited the Frölunda–Salzburg game in Frölunda Campus to be thanked by a few thousands Frölunda supporters for his time in Frölunda. Frölunda won the game 3–2.

In his fourth season with Växjö Lakers Hockey in the 2014–15 season, Kallio captained the club to their first SHL championship. On 22 July 2015, Kallio opted to return home to his original club, TPS of the Finnish Liiga on a one-year deal.

Career statistics

Regular season and playoffs

International

References

External links

 

1977 births
Atlanta Thrashers players
Colorado Avalanche draft picks
Columbus Blue Jackets players
Finnish ice hockey right wingers
Frölunda HC players
Living people
Sportspeople from Turku
Philadelphia Flyers players
HC TPS players
Växjö Lakers players
Olympic ice hockey players of Finland
Ice hockey players at the 2002 Winter Olympics
Finnish expatriate ice hockey players in the United States
Finnish expatriate ice hockey players in Sweden